Bottosaurus is an extinct genus of alligatorid from the Late Cretaceous-Early Paleocene of New Jersey, Texas, and possibly North Carolina and South Carolina. Two species are currently accepted, with a third requiring re-evaluation.

Taxonomy  and distribution
2010s phylogenetic studies have recovered Bottosaurus as a member of Alligatoridae within the subfamily Caimaninae, which indicates that Bottosaurus is more closely related to caimans than to alligators.

Bottosaurus harlani is predominantly found from Late Cretaceous strata of Maastrichtian age, such as the Hornerstown Formation and New Jersey Greensands. New material has been reported from the Rhems and Williamsburg Formations of the Black Mingo Group of the South Carolina coastal plain that dates back to the Danian and Thanetian stages of the Paleocene epoch, suggesting that Bottosaurus had survived the Cretaceous–Paleogene extinction event and lived through much of the early Paleogene period. However, this material is fragmentary, and referral to Bottosaurus should be treated as tentative.

Another species, Bottosaurus fustidens, has recently been described from the middle Paleocene (Tiffanian) of western Texas. The species is based on substantial craniomandibular and postcranial material and more solidly places Bottosaurus on the younger side of the Cretaceous-Paleogene boundary.

Description
Bottosaurus had distinctively thick osteoderms that lacked the pitting of most other crocodylians. The unusual blunt, conical tribodont crushing teeth are the most common diagnostic material to fossilize and be recovered, although teeth from the posterior portion of the jaw tend to be more laterally compressed like those of other related crocodiles. The teeth had a "wrinkled" enamel surface  and prominent annual rings with vertical ridges running down them. A short, massive lower jaw that is nearly circular in cross-section is evident from remains of the type species B. harlani. The linear frontoparietal suture between the supratemporal fenestrae indicates that Bottosaurus is related the caimans.

References

Alligatoridae
Prehistoric pseudosuchian genera
Paleogene crocodylomorphs
Late Cretaceous reptiles of North America
Late Cretaceous crocodylomorphs of North America
Paleocene reptiles of North America
Fossil taxa described in 1849